Jean-Philippe Maitre (18 June 1949 – 1 February 2006) was a Swiss politician, member of the Swiss National Council (1983–2005). He was President of the National Council from 29 November 2004, until your resigned on 1 March 2005, due to a brain tumor.

Maitre studied law at the University of Geneva and practiced as an attorney in Geneva. 

From 1973 to 1985 he was member of the cantonal parliament of Geneva. In 1985, Maitre was elected to the government of the canton of Geneva (Conseil d'Etat). He resigned in 1997, after presiding the council that year.

Maitre was married and father of three.

External links

1949 births
2006 deaths
Deaths from brain tumor
Members of the National Council (Switzerland)
Presidents of the National Council (Switzerland)
Christian Democratic People's Party of Switzerland politicians